Zhenghe Feng from the Tsinghua University, Beijing, China was named Fellow of the Institute of Electrical and Electronics Engineers (IEEE) in 2012 for contributions to smart antennas and mobile communications, and for leadership in microwave and antenna education.

References

Fellow Members of the IEEE
Living people
Year of birth missing (living people)
Place of birth missing (living people)
Academic staff of Tsinghua University